Daniel Coleborn (born 22 February 1971) is an Australian cricketer. He played in one List A match for Queensland in 1991/92.

See also
 List of Queensland first-class cricketers

References

External links
 

1971 births
Living people
Australian cricketers
Queensland cricketers
Cricketers from Toowoomba